The Crofters Holdings (Scotland) Act 1886 is an Act of the Parliament of the United Kingdom that created legal definitions of crofting parish and crofter, granted security of land tenure to crofters and produced the first Crofters Commission, a land court which ruled on disputes between landlords and crofters. The same court ruled on whether parishes were or were not crofting parishes. In many respects the Act was modelled on the Irish Land Acts of 1870 and 1881. By granting the crofters security of tenure, the Act put an end to the Highland Clearances.

The Act was largely a result of crofters' agitation which had become well organised and very persistent in Skye and of growing support, throughout the Highlands, for the Crofters Party, which had gained five members of parliament in the general election of 1885. Agitation took the form of rent strikes (withholding rent payments) and land raids (occupying land which the landlord had reserved for hunting or sheep).

The Act itself did not quell the agitation. In particular it was very weak in terms of enabling the Crofters Commission to resolve disputes about access to land. It was enough however to make much more acceptable, politically, the use of troops in confrontations with agitators.

According to John Lorne Campbell, however, the Crofters Act of 1886 was nothing less than "the Magna Carta of the Highlands and Islands, which conferred on the small tenants there something which the peasantry of Scandinavian countries had known for generations, security of tenure and the right to the principle of compensation for their own improvements at the termination of tenancies. Nothing was suggested in the report, or contained in the Act, to restrict absentee landlordism or limit the amount of land any one individual might own in Scotland, but for the moment a great advantage has been secured."

The Act was not fully effective in increasing the equality of land distribution in Scotland. By the year 2000, two-thirds of Scotland's land area was still owned by only 1,252 landowners out of a population of 5 million.

Background
During the Highland Clearances, the crofters had no official rights to the land; until 1886, it was legal to evict any crofter at the landlord's convenience. The Land Wars commenced in Scotland in 1874 with the successful legal case of the Bernera Riot on the island of Great Bernera in the Outer Hebrides.  The crofters wanted recognition of their traditional rights to the land that they had enjoyed under the clan system from the Middle Ages. Through political and economic development the gentry began to take an alternate perspective on their tenantry:

The cultural force of  [heritage] was pervasive in Gaeldom and was central to the social cohesion of the clan because it articulated the expectations of the masses that the ruling family had the responsibility to act as their protectors and guarantee secure possession of land in return for allegiance, military service, tribute and rental. It was a powerful and enduring belief which lived on long after the military rationale of clanship itself had disappeared and tribal chiefs had shed their ancient responsibilities and become commercial landlords.

Land agitation in Scotland began because of the "Home Rule" movement in Ireland and information and opinions of this movement brought by fishermen to the Outer Hebrides. Believing that they were the rightful owners of the land, crofters used rent strikes and what came to be known as land raids: crofter occupations of land to which crofters believed they should have access for common grazing or for new crofts, but which landlords had given over to sheep farming and hunting parks (called deer forests). The strife grew more intense; the landlords hired warships for protection from the crofters. From time to time there were open uprisings and riots.

In 1884 suffrage was extended to men owning land worth at least £10 or paying £10 in rent annually. This included many Highland crofters.

The Crofters' Party was established and elected five MPs in 1885. ('The people are stronger than the lord') was their best-known slogan.

William Gladstone tried to pass a new law granting crofters more rights, but it was voted down in May 1885. Gladstone left his post in 1885 but the other parties created a new government. Gladstone returned to power in January 1886, and the act was finally passed 25 June 1886.

The Act
For the first time in Scottish history, the Crofting Act of 1886 affirmed the rights of crofters to their land. It also granted a legal status to crofting towns.
The Act dealt with the following points especially:
 It gave security of tenure to the crofters, as long as they worked the croft and paid the rent.
 Crofters had the right to pass down their croft to their descendants. 
 Crofters had the right to be paid for land improvements, such as erecting fences and drainage
 A standard of reasonable rent was established and required.
 The first Crofters' Commission was established.
 Crofters had the opportunity to reassess the rent with the Crofters' Commission.

The Act specified eight counties of Scotland as counties where parishes might be recognised as crofting parishes: Argyll, Caithness, Cromarty, Inverness, Orkney, Ross, Shetland, and Sutherland. Within these counties a crofting parish was a parish where there were year-by-year tenants of land (tenants without leases) who were paying less than £30 a year in rent and who had possessed effective common grazing rights during the 80 years since 24 June 1806.

The Crofters' Commission also was in charge of establishing fair rent and reevaluating rents every seven years. If crofters believed that the rent was too high they had the opportunity to go to the commission. Quite often the rents were lowered or even removed, if the crofters had already been paying too much. The Commission had the power to reform the Act and establish other Acts, as well as grant green land to crofters in order to enlarge small crofts.

Results
There were different opinions about the Act. On the one hand crofters complained that the Act did not go far enough, because they were not granted automatic right to fertile land for expansion of their small crofts. Worse, the Act did not delineate the position of cotters, who had never had land. After a while, they saw that the Commission was willing to protect their rights, especially with regard to rent security. Unfortunately, the Commission was underfunded and there was not enough land to distribute to crofters. The Act did not resolve the greatest complaint of the crofters, that the land should be returned to them. There was no resolution of the issue where landlords and crofters wanted the same piece of land.

On the other hand, the landlords said that there was "communism looming in the future" and The Scotsman wrote that the Act was a "great infringement on the rights of private property.'"

The Act did not end the land agitation, because Arthur Balfour believed that the Act gave moral authority to the authorities to quell every uprising to reestablish "law and order." For this reason, warships were sent to the Isle of Skye and Tiree.

In the years after the Act,  (now called , "the Land League") and the Crofters' Party the political influence that they had had, because they could not agree on the issue of land and how far to follow the "Home Rule" movement in Ireland on the issue of land ownership.

This opinion was raised again in the Crofting Act 1976 in which crofters gained the legal right to purchase their land for fifteen years' rent. However, by owning their own land, crofters lost the right to CCAGS (Crofting Counties Agricultural Grant Scheme). In the Land Reform (Scotland) Act 2003 the right of purchase was given to community organizations even against the will of landowners, to advance social and economic development. The Crofting Reform (Scotland) Act 2010 granted equality between tenants and landowners, especially with regard to grants and obligations and clarified the details of residency requirements. Now, tenants or owners must live within  of the croft. Crofts not in use may be granted to new tenants.

Looking back in history, Hunter believes that the Act established an old-fashioned order, with a place for the tenantry quite different than as in Ireland where crofters could buy their land under "Home Rule" acts. The Act was neither effective in the development of crofting communities nor did it encompass the political and social beliefs of those communities. Wightman also stated that the "land question" has yet to be resolved, as two-thirds of Scotland's land area is still owned by only 1,252 landowners out of a population of 5 million.

Primary Legislation since 1886 

There has been a steady flow of primary legislation on crofting, including:

 Crofters Holdings (Scotland) Act 1886
 Crofters Holding (Scotland) Act 1887
 Crofters Commission (Delegation of Powers) Act 1888
 Crofters Common Grazings Regulation Act, 1891
 Small Landholders (Scotland) Act 1911
 Crofters (Scotland) Act 1955
 Crofters (Scotland) Act 1961
 Crofting Reform (Scotland) Act 1976
 Crofters (Scotland) Act 1993
 Transfer of Crofting Estates (Scotland) Act 1997
 Crofting Reform etc. Act 2007
 Crofting Reform (Scotland) Act 2010
 Crofting (Amendment) (Scotland) Act 2013

This is summarised in David Findlay's Blog for the Law Society of Scotland.

See also
 Highland Clearances
 Highland Potato Famine
 History of Scotland § Rural life

Citations

References

External links

Crofting
Acts of the Parliament of the United Kingdom concerning Scotland
United Kingdom Acts of Parliament 1886
History of human rights
History of Orkney
History of Shetland
History of the Outer Hebrides
History of the Scottish Highlands
History of Argyll and Bute
1886 in Scotland
Highland Estates
Highlands and Islands of Scotland
Agriculture legislation in the United Kingdom
Land law